St Joseph's Church is a Roman Catholic parish church in Aberavon, Port Talbot, Wales. It was built from 1930 to 1931 for the Benedictines in the Romanesque Revival style. It is located on Water Street on the west side of the River Afan. It is a Grade II listed building.

History

Foundation
In 1849, a mission was started to serve the Catholic population of Aberavon. The priest was the Benedictine Fr Charles Kavanagh. he came from St David's Priory Church in Swansea. Various location in the area were used as a chapel, such as a Baptist Chapel, Capel Moria, from 1852 to 1860. From 1860 to 1862, Fr Edward Glassbrook served the mission. During that time, a church that also housed a  school was built on the site of the current church. The architect and builder was a local, John King. From that church Fr Glassbrook went out and founded missions in the surrounding area. Some of those missions grew and went on to become churches in their own right, such as Our Lady and St Patrick Church in Maesteg. In 1870, a separate school was built next door. In 1905, Fr Philip Kelly was the priest and a larger presbytery was built next to the church. In 1928, a parish hall was built.

Construction
On 11 September 1930, the foundation stone for the current church was laid by Archbishop of Cardiff Francis Mostyn. The architect was Cyril Bates, who also built St Patrick's Church in Newport. He designed the church to be in the Romanesque Revival style. The total cost was £12,864. On 29 October 1931, the church was opened by Archbishop Mostyn.

Parish
St Joseph's Church is its own parish. At some point after the church's construction, the Benedictines handed over the parish to the Diocese of Menevia who continue to serve the congregation. Every weekend the church has Masses at 5:00pm and 6:00pm on Saturday and at 8:30am and at 10:00am on Sunday.

References

External links
 
 

Buildings and structures in Port Talbot
Roman Catholic churches in Wales
Roman Catholic Diocese of Menevia
Grade II listed churches in Neath Port Talbot
Grade II listed Roman Catholic churches in Wales
Romanesque Revival church buildings in the United Kingdom
20th-century Roman Catholic church buildings in the United Kingdom
1930 establishments in Wales
Roman Catholic churches completed in 1931
Religious organizations established in 1930